Chinese Literature Today (CLT) is a biannual Chinese literature and culture journal jointly hosted and edited by Beijing Normal University and the University of Oklahoma, and produced and published by Routledge.  Launched in summer 2010, CLT is an offshoot of the award-winning magazine World Literature Today. This cross-culture cooperation has also produced a translated book series on contemporary Chinese literature.

References

External links

2010 establishments in Oklahoma
Biannual magazines published in the United States
Literary magazines published in the United States
Beijing Normal University
Literary magazines published in China
Magazines established in 2010
Magazines published in Oklahoma
University of Oklahoma